Kjetil Jerve (born 28 August 1988) is a Norwegian jazz pianist and composer. He was born in Ålesund.

Discography

Solo albums 

 2016: New York Improvisations (Dugnad Rec), with Jimmy Halperin, Drew Gress
 2017: Circumstances (AMP Music & Records), with Anders Thorén, Tim Thornton
 2020:  The Soundtrack Of My Home (Dugnad Rec)

Collaborations 
 With Lana Trio (Andreas Wildhagen, Henrik Munkeby Nørstebø)
 2013: Lana Trio (Va Fongool)	
 2014: Live In Japan (Va Fongool)
 2018: Lana Trio With Sofia Jernberg (Clean Feed)

 With Kristoffer Eikrem
 2014: Feeling // Emotion (NorCD)

 With Orter Eparg (Andreas Wildhagen, Dan Peter Sundland)
 2016: Orter Eparg (Øra Fonogram)

 With Akmee (Andreas Wildhagen, Erik Kimestad Pedersen, Erlend Albertsen)
 2017: Neptun (Nakama Records)

 With RødssalG nEEn GlassdøR (Andreas Wildhagen, Erik Kimestad Pedersen, Erlend Albertsen, Martin Myhre Olsen, Nils Andreas Granseth)
 2018: RødssalG nEEn GlassdøR (Dugnad Rec)

 With Jul På Sunnmørsk (Henrik Lødøen, Martin Morland, Siril Malmedal Hauge, Sondre Ferstad)
 2018: Jul På Sunnmørsk (Dugnad Rec)

References

External links 

 

21st-century Norwegian pianists
Chamber jazz pianists
Norwegian jazz composers
Norwegian jazz pianists
Musicians from Ålesund
1988 births
Living people
NorCD artists